Staged is a British television comedy series. Set and filmed during the COVID-19 pandemic in the United Kingdom, primarily using video-conferencing technology, the series star actors Michael Sheen and David Tennant as fictionalised versions of themselves. Simon Evans, Georgia Tennant, Anna Lundberg, and Lucy Eaton also star. The first series premiered 10 June 2020 on BBC One, and the second series premiered 4 January 2021 on BBC One. A Comic Relief New Year Special was uploaded to the BritBox YouTube page on 31 December 2021. A third series premiered 24 November 2022 on BritBox.

Premise
In the first series, Michael Sheen and David Tennant play fictionalised versions of themselves, trying to rehearse a performance of Luigi Pirandello's Six Characters in Search of an Author during lockdown via videoconference, while the underconfident director, Simon, struggles to keep control of the production.

The second series follows the "real" Michael and David following the success of the first series of Staged. Simon begins work on an American remake of the first series but Michael and David are not asked to reprise their roles.

The third series starts with Simon trying to get Michael and David to agree to a Christmas staged version of Six Characters in Search of an Author, and later A Christmas Carol, before becoming a metafictional behind the scenes documentary of the show entitled Backstaged.

Cast

Main
 David Tennant
 Michael Sheen

Co-starring
 Simon Evans, the director of the play and of Staged. Evans' acting role in the series is uncredited.
 Georgia Tennant, David's wife
 Anna Lundberg, Michael's girlfriend
 Lucy Eaton, Simon's sister

Guest
Guest stars play themselves unless otherwise noted.

Series 1 
 Nina Sosanya as Jo, financier of the play
 Rebecca Gage as Janine, assistant to Jo (voice only)
 Samuel L. Jackson
 Adrian Lester
 Judi Dench

Series 2 
 Nina Sosanya
 Whoopi Goldberg as Mary, agent to Michael and David
 Ben Schwartz as Tom, assistant to Mary
 Romesh Ranganathan
 Michael Palin
 Nick Frost
 Simon Pegg
 Christoph Waltz
 Ewan McGregor
 Hugh Bonneville
 Ken Jeong
 Jim Parsons
 Josh Gad
 Phoebe Waller-Bridge
 Cate Blanchett

Series 3 
 Neil Gaiman
 Jim Broadbent
 Ty Tennant
 Ben Schwartz
 Adrian Lester
 Nina Sosanya
 Lily Mo Sheen
 Olivia Colman

Episodes

Series 1 (2020)

Series 2 (2021)

Special (2021)

Series 3 (2022)

Release
The series premiered on 10 June 2020 on BBC One. On 22 October 2020, it was announced that a second series had been commissioned. The second series premiered on 4 January 2021 on BBC One, and all eight episodes were added to BBC iPlayer on the same day. A New Year Special was uploaded to BritBox YouTube page on 31 December 2021, with Michael, David, Simon, Georgia, Anna & Lucy all reprising their roles.

The first series was released in the U.S. via streaming service Hulu on 16 September 2020.

A third series of six episodes premiered on 24 November 2022 on BritBox UK.

Reception
The first series was well received by critics. Louis Chilton, in a four-starred review for The Independent, described Staged as "a welcome distraction, an eminently watchable portrait of two artists as petulant, egotistical children". Anna Leszkiewicz, for the New Statesman, said it was "charming: absurdly silly in a quiet, understated way". Rupert Hawksley, in the i, described it as "compelling 'lockdown' television". Gabriel Tate, reviewing Staged for Metro, said "Sheen and Tennant shared a warmth and willingness to take the mickey out of each other that felt entirely unforced." Fergus Morgan, writing in The Stage, gave the production five stars and said: "Tennant and Sheen are excellent, perennially, even when performing as themselves to their own laptops. Here, joined by Evans and by their real-life spouses – the actors Georgia Tennant and Anna Lundberg – they are on top form, crackling with snide chemistry. The whole thing is a treat."

The second series received more mixed reviews. Rupert Hawksley of The Independent called the first episode "stale and indulgent [...] Perhaps Staged was always this smug and we just didn’t notice, so grateful were we to have something new to watch, but the tone is now horribly out of step with the national mood." Writing for The Telegraph, Anita Singh criticised the meta aspects of the second series, saying "Staged is at its best when the duo are being funny, rather than debating whether or not they’re funny."

References

External links
 
 
 
 

2020 British television series debuts
2020s British comedy television series
2020s British sitcoms
Adaptations of works by Luigi Pirandello
BBC television comedy
BBC television sitcoms
Media depictions of the COVID-19 pandemic in the United Kingdom
English-language television shows
Television shows about the COVID-19 pandemic